James Greenwood (born 7 June 1991) is an English professional rugby league footballer who plays as a  and  for Swinton Lions in the RFL Championship, on loan from the Salford Red Devils in the Betfred Super League.

He has previously played for the South Wales Scorpions in League 1, Wigan Warriors in the Super League, spending time on loan from Wigan in South Wales in League 1, the London Broncos, Salford Red Devils and Hull Kingston Rovers in the Super League and Workington Town in the Kingstone Press Championship. Greenwood also played for Hull Kingston Rovers in the Super League.

Background
Greenwood was born in Oldham, Greater Manchester, England.

Personal life
He is the brother of fellow rugby league footballer, Joe Greenwood.

Early career
Greenwood started his amateur playing career at the Saddleworth Rangers and he is a product of the Wigan Warriors' Academy System.

Senior career

South Wales Scorpions

2012
In 2012, he played for League 1 side the South Wales Scorpions, Greenwood only appeared sporadically for the club.

2013
He returned to the Scorpions in the 2013 rugby league season on a loan basis.

Wigan Warriors

2013
In 2013, Greenwood was transferred to the Wigan Warriors, where he was then subsequently loaned back to his former club the South Wales Scorpions shortly after.

London Broncos

2014

Workington Town

2015
He spent time on loan at Workington Town in 2015, as part of a dual-registration agreement.

Salford Red Devils

2015
In 2015, Greenwood was loaned to Salford for a short period of time.

Hull Kingston Rovers

2015
Greenwood was sent out once again on loan from the Wigan Warriors in 2015, this time to Hull Kingston Rovers, where he impressed enough to turn his loan-deal from the Wigan Warriors into a full-time two-year contract.

2016 & 2017
Greenwood suffered relegation from the Super League with Hull Kingston Rovers in the 2016 season, due to losing the Million Pound Game at the hands of Salford.

12-months later however, Greenwood was part of the Hull Kingston Rovers' side that won promotion back to the Super League, at the first time of asking following relegation the season prior.

2018
Greenwood made 23 appearances for Hull KR in all competitions as the club finished 10th on the table and avoided relegation.

2019
On 14 March, Greenwood was taken from the field during round 5 of the 2019 Super League season against Wakefield Trinity.  He was later ruled out for the entire year after scans revealed he ruptured his anterior cruciate knee ligament.

Salford Red Devils

2020
In 2020, Greenwood joined Salford and later played for the club in their 2020 Challenge Cup Final defeat against Leeds.

References

External links

Hull KR profile
SL profile

1991 births
Living people
Barrow Raiders players
English rugby league players
Hull Kingston Rovers players
London Broncos players
Rugby league players from Oldham
Rugby league second-rows
Rugby league props
Salford Red Devils players
South Wales Scorpions players
Swinton Lions players
Wigan Warriors players
Workington Town players